Anyox was a small company-owned mining town in British Columbia, Canada. Today it is a ghost town, abandoned and largely destroyed.

Early history
The remote valley was long a hunting and trapping area for the Nisga'a, and the name Anyox means “hidden waters” in the Nisga'a language.  The first Europeans in the area were the members of the Vancouver Expedition, who surveyed the inlet in 1793.

Nisga'a legends told of a mountain of gold, attracting speculators for years. In 1910, the Granby Consolidated Mining, Smelting and Power Company (Granby Consolidated) started buying land in the area. They soon found gold.

Town and mines
Granby Consolidated started construction of the town in 1912. By 1914, Anyox had grown to a population of almost 3,000 residents, as the mine and smelter were put into full operation; rich lodes of copper and other precious metals were mined from the nearby mountains. Granby Consolidated moved its copper mining interests here from  Phoenix, British Columbia. Copper was mined from the Hidden Creek and Bonanza deposits and smelted on site. Coal to fuel the smelter was shipped from the company built and owned town of Granby on Vancouver Island and Fernie in southeastern British Columbia.

The company town was a very large operation with onsite railways, machine shops, curling rink, golf course and a hospital. In the spring of  1918, Granby Consolidated built the first wooden tennis court in Canada, for additional recreation. That same year, incoming ships brought the Spanish flu epidemic to Anyox. Charles Clarkson Rhodes, the Chief Accountant for the Granby Consolidated operations in Anyox, died on October 29, 1918, while helping to treat patients in the Anyox Hospital. Dozens of workers and residents of Anyox died from that flu epidemic.

Anyox was almost wiped out by forest fires in 1923, but the townsite was rebuilt and mining operations continued. Acid rain from the smelter denuded the trees from the hillsides which soon became bare.

The Great Depression drove down the demand for copper, effectively the beginning of the end for Anyox. Operations continued, but were steadily scaled down while the company stockpiled  of copper, three years of production, that it was unable to sell. The mine shut down in 1935, and the town was abandoned. Salvage operations in the 1940s removed most machinery and steel from the town, and two forest fires, in 1942 and 1943, burned all remaining wood structures.

Ongoing developments
Active mineral exploration continues in the area. In the 1980s, local entrepreneurs teamed with Vancouver investors to purchase the long dormant operations from the owner of record. Whenever there is a rise in the price of copper, there is speculation about the possibility of re-development – though none has ever occurred.

Since 2000, the current owners have been trying to attract interest in rehabilitating the hydroelectric dam, to either supply the British Columbia grid or to attract and serve an on-site natural gas liquefaction facility.

The town was the subject of the 2022 documentary film Anyox.

Notable residents
Former Vancouver mayor Jack Volrich was one of the 351 people born in Anyox, as was Thomas Waterland, MLA for Yale-Lillooet from 1975 to 1986.

Reid Mitchell, who represented Canada in basketball at the 1948 Olympics, also was born in Anyox.

See also
 Kitsault

References

External links
Pictures of Anyox today

Ghost towns in British Columbia
Company towns in Canada
North Coast of British Columbia